Wando Seaweeds Expo is the world’s first international exposition themed to seaweeds, which, starting in 2014, has been held in Wan-do (‘island’), Republic of Korea every three years with the topic of seaweeds such as nori, sea mustard, kelp, and hijiki.

Mascots & Symbol

Mascots 
The mascots, Haecho and Micho take their motives from the seaweeds that grow on elvan scattered in the sea off Wando.

Symbol 
With the motives of seaweeds and sea, it succinctly expresses the earth that has seaweeds grow in clean water. The red color represents the development of red algae and seaweeds industry and the green color symbolizes green algae and clean natural environment, while the brown color stands for brown algae. Representing future on-farm resources and depicting the smoldering seaweeds, the shape symbolizes the unity of humankind and the wish to serve as a festive event for the whole humankind.

Past Seaweeds EXPO

year 2014 
Event Name : Wando Seaweeds Expo 2014
period : 2014. 4. 11 ~ 2014. 5. 11 (31 days)
Theme: Discovery of future life, Seaweeds
Event Halls : Main Theme Hall(Energy), Health Food Hall(Food), Industrial Resources Hall(Industrial), Ecology Environment Hall(Live), Aquatic Culture Hall(Culture)
Host & Organizer : Wando County, Jeolla-namdo, Wando Seaweeds Expo Committee
Sponsors :  Ministry of Oceans and Fisheries, Ministry of Culture, Sports and Tourism, and the Algae Society of Korea

year 2017 
Event Name : Wando Seaweeds Expo 2017
period : 2017. 4. 14 ~ 2014. 5. 7 (24 days)
Theme: Promise of Seaweeds, Challenge the Future!
Event Halls : Hall of Understanding Seaweeds, Hall of Earth Environment, Hall of Mystical Sea, Hall of Health and Humanity, Hall of Future Resources, Hall of Participation 
Host & Organizer : Wando County, Jeolla-namdo, Wando Seaweeds Expo Committee
Sponsors :  Ministry of Oceans and Fisheries, Suhyup, NH Nonghyup Bank, Korea Rural Community Corporation, Korea Agro-Fisheries & Food Trade Corporation, Korea Fisheries Resources Agency, Cheonan Nonsan Expressway

Characteristics of 2017 Expo 
Closed on May 7, 2015 Wando Seaweeds Expo was visited by 937,000 or so people from home or abroad.

Of its exhibition halls, Hall of Marine Mysteries, Hall of Healthy Humankind, and Hall of Future Resources were installed on barges at sea, while Hall of Marine Mysteries presented various images of seaweeds in 3D on a 360-degree water screen.

Also, a VR system was installed in Hall of Earth Environment to let the viewers get a vivid experience of the seaweed forest under the sea.

References

External links 
Main Homepage

Counties of South Jeolla Province
 
Festivals in South Korea
Spring (season) events in South Korea